Gregorio "Gregory" Luna 
(17 November 1932 – 6 November 1999) was a San Antonio, Texas politician who served as a Democrat in both the Texas House of Representatives and the Texas Senate for the 14 years from 1985 to 1999. While in the legislature, Luna was considered to be a "champion of education". He was also one of the founders of the Mexican American Legal Defense and Education Fund, and served four terms as board chair.

Early life
Luna was born to Eliseo and Elvira Luna in New Braunfels, Texas, the youngest of their eight children. When Gregory was seven months old, Eliseo Luna died and, shortly afterward, the family moved to San Antonio.Also brother of Federico Luna a civil rights activist in New Braunfels who fought discrimination in the 1940s While growing up, Luna worked as a restaurant bus boy, a grocery-store sacker and in the mailroom at the San Antonio Express.

At 21, after attending San Antonio College briefly, Luna enlisted in the United States Army and served a short stint, advancing to the rank of corporal. After his service, he joined the San Antonio Police Department. While an officer, Luna attended night classes and graduated from Trinity University with a Bachelor of Arts in math and St. Mary's University School of Law with a law degree. While an officer, Luna also helped train police officers in Venezuela as part of a U.S. government program. Luna began his law career as a prosecutor for the City of San Antonio, and opened a started a private law practice in 1968.

Luna married Helen Garcia 21 August 1955 and had two sons and two daughters.

Political career
In 1969, Luna unsuccessfully ran for Justice of the Peace in Bexar County. In 1982, he ran for the District 116 Texas House seat, losing to Joe A. Gamez in the Democratic Party primary election. In 1984, Luna sought the same House seat again, this time successfully. He represented San Antonio from 1985 to 1993 in the Texas House.

In 1992, when then-state Senator Frank Tejeda opted to make a run for U.S. Congress, Luna sought Tejeda's senate seat in District 19. He defeated the Republican challenger, auto dealer Ernesto Ancira for the four-year term.

A Democratic redistricting plan (which also altered district numbering) necessitated all state senators to run for reelection in 1994, and as a result, Luna faced an unsuccessful challenge from Republican Andrew Longaker for the remaining two years of his term, this time in District 26. In 1996, Luna again fended off a challenge from Longaker, this time for a four-year term.

Luna missed most of the regular session of the 76th Legislature due to ill health. He was ailing from complications related to diabetes, which eventually required the amputation of both his legs. Citing his ill health, Luna resigned his senate seat on 24 September 1999. Luna died peacefully after midnight 6 November 1999 at a hospice inpatient center in San Antonio, where he had been for three weeks. He was buried in the Texas State Cemetery on 9 November 1999.

Luna is honored by the Texas Senate Hispanic Research Council through the Senator Gregory Luna Legislative Scholar and Fellows Program which places college students with members of the Texas Senate to gain leadership experience.

Election history
Senate election history of Luna.

Most recent election

1996

Previous elections

1994

1992

References

1932 births
1999 deaths
Members of the Texas House of Representatives
Texas state senators
Texas lawyers
American politicians of Mexican descent
Hispanic and Latino American state legislators in Texas
People from San Antonio
People from New Braunfels, Texas
United States Army soldiers
20th-century American lawyers
20th-century American politicians